Multi Ammunition Softkill System (MASS) is a naval self-defence system produced by Rheinmetall of Germany. It is connected to the ship's sensors and protects ships from attacks by advanced sensor-guided missiles by launching decoys that operate in all relevant wavelengths of the electromagnetic spectrum: ultraviolet, electro-optical, laser, infrared and radar. MASS can be either plugged into the command and control module of a naval vessel, or operate autonomously.

Rheinmetall Defence stated that "MASS has attracted orders from 9 nations, for 130 launchers, on 15 different classes of naval vessels" as of 31 March 2009. As of 3 March 2011, this has been expanded to a total order of at least 172 units. Roughly one year later, on the 17 April 2012, the total was 186 launchers for 22 different classes of vessels in 11 different nations.

Customers 
 : s, s, s, s, and the future s
 : s
 : s
 : s, s, s, s
 : s, as part of the ANZAC modernization programme.
 : s
 : s
 : s, s, and s
 : s, s, s
 : 
 : LST-II-class landing ships
 Two additional unknown customers.

Notes

Further reading
 Rheinmetall Defence - Mass Multi Ammunition Softkill System
 Rheinmetall Defence (March 31/09) - Rheinmetall to equip Canadian Navy frigates with Mass
 Rheinmetall Defence (April 21/08) - Mass decoy system safeguards ships from symmetric and asymmetric threats
 Behoerden Spiegel - MASS fuer die VAE

Military technology
Weapons countermeasures
Missile countermeasures